William Herbert Jones (born 1 May 1906 – died  Pontyberem) was a Welsh rugby union, and professional rugby league footballer who played in the 1930s.

Biography
Jones was born in Llanelli, Wales on May 1, 1906.

He played representative level rugby union (RU) for Wales, and at club level for Llanelli RFC, as a Scrum-half, i.e. number 9, and club level rugby league (RL) for St. Helens, as a  i.e. number 7.

International honours
Bert Jones won caps for Wales (RU) while at Llanelli RFC in 1934 against Scotland, and Ireland.

References

External links
Search for "Jones" at rugbyleagueproject.org

Statistics at scrum.com
Statistics at wru.co.uk
Profile at saints.org.uk

1906 births
1982 deaths
Footballers who switched code
Llanelli RFC players
Rugby league halfbacks
Rugby league players from Llanelli
Rugby union players from Llanelli
Rugby union scrum-halves
St Helens R.F.C. players
Wales international rugby union players
Welsh rugby league players
Welsh rugby union players